Yossi Mizrahi (born 1953) is a retired Israeli goalkeeper and is a current manager.

Early life
Yosef (Yossi) Mizrahi was born in West Jerusalem on April 4, 1953. He grew up in Katamon and studied at Ma'aleh state religious school. As a teenager, he played on the youth team of Hapoel Jerusalem.

Career 
In 1974–1987, Mizrahi was the goalkeeper for Beitar Jerusalem. Two years after he joined the team, it won the State Cup for the first time. In 1994, Mizrahi was assistant coach under Amatzia Levkovic. In 1994, Levkovic was fired four games into the season and Mizrahi was appointed head coach. He later coached Hapoel Jerusalem, Maccabi Petah Tikva,  F.C. Ashdod, Beitar Jerusalem FC, Apollon Limassol (Cyprus) and worked with Avram Grant as assistant coach in Israel's 2004 European Championship qualifying campaign.

Mizrahi is described as an "impeccable tactician, capable of turning wretched teams around and loved by his players."

Despite him winning the Championship with Beitar Jerusalem in the end of the season of 2006/07, Mizrahi was fired from the Club and signed with Apollon Limassol in Cyprus.

On April 21, 2008, Mizrahi left Apollon Limassol and returned to manage F.C. Ashdod. He resigned from F.C. Ashdod on May 20, 2010.

On June 10, 2010, Mizrahi signed with Maccabi Tel Aviv. He resigned from the team on January 4, 2011. He subsequently signed with F.C. Ashdod on April 18, 2011.

References 

Israeli Jews
1953 births
Living people
Israeli footballers
Israel international footballers
Israeli football managers
Association football goalkeepers
Beitar Jerusalem F.C. players
Hapoel Lod F.C. players
Shimshon Tel Aviv F.C. players
Beitar Jerusalem F.C. managers
Hapoel Jerusalem F.C. managers
Maccabi Petah Tikva F.C. managers
F.C. Ashdod managers
Apollon Limassol FC managers
Maccabi Tel Aviv F.C. managers
Maccabi Netanya F.C. managers
Bnei Yehuda Tel Aviv F.C. managers
Hapoel Katamon Jerusalem F.C. managers
Israeli Premier League managers
Expatriate football managers in Cyprus
Israeli expatriate football managers in Cyprus
Footballers from Jerusalem
Israeli people of Iraqi-Jewish descent